Plesiocis cribrum is a species of beetle in the family Ciidae, the only species in the genus Plesiocis.

References

Ciidae genera